Pintara is an Indomalayan  genus of spread-winged skippers in the family Hesperiidae.

Species
Pintara capiloides Devyatkin, 1998 - Vietnam
Pintara bowringi Devyatkin, 1998 - Hainan, Vietnam
Pintara tabrica (Hewitson, [1873]) - Southeast China, Vietnam
Pintara pinwilli (Butler, [1879]) - Burma, Thailand, Vietnam, Malay Peninsula
Pintara prasobsuki (Ek-Amnuay, 2006) - Laos

References

Natural History Museum Lepidoptera genus database

Tagiadini
Hesperiidae genera